"Bennie and the Jets" (also titled "Benny & the Jets") is a song written by English musician Elton John and songwriter Bernie Taupin, and performed by John. The song first appeared on the Goodbye Yellow Brick Road album in 1973. "Bennie and the Jets" has been one of John's most popular songs and was performed during his appearance at Live Aid.

The track was a massive hit in the United States and Canada, released in 1974 as an A-side and spelt 'Bennie'. In most territories the track was released as the B-side to "Candle in the Wind", but spelt 'Benny'. Album artwork (back-cover track listing and center-panel design) consistently lists the song as 'Bennie' while either 'Bennie' or 'Benny' appears on the vinyl album depending on territory. The track was released as an A-side in the UK in 1976, as "Benny and the Jets".

It is ranked number 371 on Rolling Stone'''s list of The 500 Greatest Songs of All Time.

Song composition
The song tells of "Bennie and the Jets", a fictional band of whom the song's narrator is a fan. In a 2014 Rolling Stone interview, Taupin said "I saw Bennie and the Jets as a sort of proto-sci-fi punk band, fronted by an androgynous woman, who looks like something out of a Helmut Newton photograph." The greed and glitz of the early 1970s music scene is portrayed by Taupin's words:We'll kill the fatted calf tonight, so stick aroundyou're gonna hear electric music, solid walls of soundTaupin goes on to describe the flashy wardrobe of "Bennie", the leader of the band:She's got electric boots, a mohair suitYou know I read it in a magazine, oh...Produced by Gus Dudgeon, the song was recorded during the Goodbye Yellow Brick Road sessions in France at Château d'Hérouville's Strawberry Studios, where John and Taupin had recorded their previous two albums Honky Château and Don't Shoot Me I'm Only the Piano Player.

John rarely plays the studio arrangement of the song, and often makes subtle or even drastic changes, sometimes including phrases from Glenn Miller's "In the Mood" and closing with the five-note combination from John Williams' score for Close Encounters of the Third Kind. During his live performances, the piano solo has been played in all sorts of variations, from very close to the original to wildly improvised and extended versions, such as the elaborate version during his Central Park concert in 1980, the version from his June 30, 1984, Wembley Stadium performance and another take on it during the "Elton and his band" part of the show recorded in Sydney, Australia, on December 14, 1986, his last show before his throat surgery in January 1987.

 Production 
Despite sounding as though recorded live, the song was actually recorded in studio, with live sound effects added in later. Producer Gus Dudgeon explained:

Dudgeon mixed in sounds from a 1972 performance of John in Royal Festival Hall and a 1970 Jimi Hendrix concert at the Isle of Wight. He included a series of whistles from a live concert in Vancouver, and added hand claps and various shouts.

Single release
The song was the closing track on side one of the double album Goodbye Yellow Brick Road, and John was set against releasing it as a single, believing it would fail. CKLW in Windsor, Ontario, began heavy airplay of the song and it became the No. 1 song in the Detroit market. This attention caused other American and Canadian Top 40 stations to add it to their playlists as well. As a result, the song peaked at No. 1 on the US singles chart in 1974. In the US, it was certified Gold on 8 April 1974 and Platinum on 13 September 1995 by the RIAA, and had sold 2.8 million copies by August 1976.Cash Box said that "the song is a strong one and worth every second of its 5:10." Record World said that "With Elton showcasing his remarkable voice range, it can't miss grabbing the top spot."

"Bennie and the Jets" was John's first Top 40 hit on what at the time was called the Billboard Hot Soul Singles chart, where it peaked at No. 15, the highest position out of the three of his singles which reached that chart. The acceptance of "Bennie" on R&B radio helped land John, a huge soul music fan, a guest appearance on 17 May 1975 edition of Soul Train, where he played "Bennie and the Jets" and "Philadelphia Freedom". In Canada, it held the No. 1 spot on the RPM national singles chart for two weeks (13–20 April), becoming his first No. 1 single of 1974 and his fourth overall.

Personnel
 Elton John – piano, Farfisa organ, vocals
 Davey Johnstone – acoustic guitar
 Dee Murray – bass
 Nigel Olsson – drums

 Music video 
In May 2017, the music video for "Bennie and the Jets" premiered at the Cannes Film Festival as a winner of Elton John: The Cut, a competition organised in partnership with AKQA, Pulse Films, and YouTube in honour of the fiftieth anniversary of his songwriting relationship with Bernie Taupin. The competition called upon independent filmmakers to submit treatments for music videos for one of three Elton John songs from the 1970s, with each song falling within a specific concept category. "Bennie and the Jets" was designated for the choreography category, and was directed by Jack Whiteley and Laura Brownhill. The video was influenced by early cinema and the work of Busby Berkeley, portraying characters as participants on a talent show auditioning for Bennie.

Charts and certifications

Weekly charts

Year-end charts

All-time charts

Certifications

Covers and interpolations 
 The Beastie Boys released a cover of this song on their The Sounds of Science album in 1999. The song, titled "Benny and the Jets", was sung by frequent Beastie Boys collaborator Biz Markie, who often mumbles the words while singing. This recording was first released in 1995 as a flexi disc inside of issue two of the Beastie Boys' Grand Royal magazine.
 Mary J. Blige used many elements from the piano chorus from "Bennie and the Jets" on her single "Deep Inside" (from her 1999 album Mary). Because of the extensive use of the piano parts, both Elton John and Bernie Taupin are credited as co-writers of "Deep Inside". An alternative version of the music video for the track features Elton John playing the piano on stage.
 Miguel and rapper Wale recorded a cover of the song for the 2014 reissue of the Goodbye Yellow Brick Road album. Elton John praised their interpretation of "Bennie and the Jets", telling Rolling Stone magazine, "Miguel's done a fantastic job. It really makes the best of what the song is all about."
Pink recorded a cover of the song with rapper Logic for the album Revamp: Reimagining the Songs of Elton John & Bernie Taupin.

Mondegreens in the song
The song contains the line "She's got electric boots, a mohair suit", which is often misheard as "She's got electric boobs, and mohair shoes". A scene in the film 27 Dresses'' shows that this is but one of many mondegreens that listeners have invented for this song.

References

External links
 

Elton John songs
1974 singles
Billboard Hot 100 number-one singles
Cashbox number-one singles
RPM Top Singles number-one singles
Songs with music by Elton John
Songs with lyrics by Bernie Taupin
Mondegreens
Live singles
Fictional musical groups
Song recordings produced by Gus Dudgeon
1973 songs
MCA Records singles
DJM Records singles
Songs about music